Artyom Aleksandrovich Mitasov (born 12 March 1990) is a Russian former professional football player.

Club career
He made his Russian Football National League debut for FC Shinnik Yaroslavl on 11 July 2015 in a game against FC Baltika Kaliningrad.

References

External links
 
 
 

1990 births
Sportspeople from Kursk
Living people
Russian footballers
Association football midfielders
FC Rubin Kazan players
FC Shinnik Yaroslavl players
FC Fakel Voronezh players
FC Gorodeya players
FC Avangard Kursk players
Belarusian Premier League players
Russian expatriate footballers
Expatriate footballers in Belarus